Oakland Township is the name of three townships in the U.S. state of Pennsylvania:

 Oakland Township, Butler County, Pennsylvania
 Oakland Township, Susquehanna County, Pennsylvania
 Oakland Township, Venango County, Pennsylvania

See also 

 Oakland, Pennsylvania

Pennsylvania township disambiguation pages